Haki R. Madhubuti (born Don Luther Lee on February 23, 1942, in Little Rock, Arkansas, United States) is an African-American author, educator, and poet, as well as a publisher and operator of black-themed bookstore. He is particularly recognized in connection with the founding in 1967 of Third World Press, considered the oldest independent black publishing house in the U.S.

Madhubuti is a much sought-after poet and lecturer, and has convened workshops and served as guest/keynote speaker at thousands of colleges, universities, libraries and community centers in the U.S. and abroad.

The name Haki means "just" or "justice," and Madhubuti means "precise, accurate and dependable," both names deriving from the Swahili language. He changed his name in 1974.

Biography

Early years and education 
Born Donald Luther Lee in Little Rock, Arkansas, Madhubuti adopted his Swahili name after visiting Africa in 1974. He was raised in Detroit, Michigan, with his mother until the age of 16, when she was murdered. Madhubuti claims that his mother, Maxine, is the prime force behind his creativity and interest in black literature and arts. After serving in the United States Army from 1960 to 1963, Madhubuti received a Master of Fine Arts degree from the prestigious Iowa Writers' Workshop at the University of Iowa.

Black Arts Movement and Third World Press 
Madhubuti became deeply interested in and influenced by Black Arts Movement (BAM) figures such as Richard Wright at an early age. He is a major contributor to the Black literary tradition, in particular through his early association with BAM beginning in the mid-1960s, and has had a lasting and major influence.
Recognizing the lack of resources and institutions dedicated to black scholars, Madhubuti has become a leading proponent of independent Black institutions. 

In December 1967, Madhubuti met with Carolyn Rodgers and Johari Amini in the basement of a South Side Chicago apartment to found Third World Press, an outlet for African-American literature.
Forty years later in 2007, the company continued to thrive in a multimillion-dollar facility. It is considered the largest independent black publishing house in the U.S. Over the years, this press would publish works for Pulitzer Prize-winning author Gwendolyn Brooks, as well as Amiri Baraka, Sonia Sanchez, Sterling Plumpp and Pearl Cleage.

Writing style and publications 
Heavily influenced by his creative predecessor Gwendolyn Brooks, Madhubuti's poetry is similar marked by a rhythmic, experimental style, frequently in the free verse form. Also like Brooks, Madhubuti's poetic bibliography is characterized by a shift from the personal to the political over the span of his career. He has dedicated a number of poems to her and is the founder and previously the director emeritus of the Gwendolyn Brooks Center for Black Literature and Creative Writing.

Over the years, he has published 28 books (some under his former name, "Don L. Lee") and remains one of the world's best-selling authors of poetry and non-fiction, with books in print in excess of 3 million. His subsequent books include Claiming Earth: Race, Rage, Rape, Redemption (1994), GroundWork: New and Selected Poems 1966–1996 (1996), and HeartLove: Wedding and Love Poems (1998).

Madhubuti has also co-edited two volumes of literary works from Gallery 37: releasing The Spirit (1998), and Describe the Moment (2000). His poetry and essays were published in over 30 anthologies from 1997 to 2001. He also wrote Tough Notes: A Healing Call For Creating Exceptional Black Men (2002). Perhaps his most famous work, Black Men: Obsolete, Single, Dangerous?: The African American Family in Transition, a nonfiction book about African-American social issues, was published in 1990 and has sold more than 1,000,000 copies.

Other initiatives 
Besides co-founding a publishing company, Madhubuti co-founded other initiatives including (with Larry Neal) the Black Books Bulletin, the Institute of Positive Education/New Concept Development Center (established in 1969), and the Betty Shabazz International Charter School (established 1998) in Chicago, Illinois.  He is also a founder and board member of the National Association of Black Book Publishers, a founder and chairman of the board of The International Literary Hall of Fame for Writers of African Descent, and founder and director of the National Black Writers Retreat. Prior to stepping down, Madhubuti held the position of Distinguished University Professor, co-founder and director emeritus of the Gwendolyn Brooks Center for Black Literature and Creative Writing and director of the Master of Fine Arts in Creative Writing program at Chicago State University.

Personal life 
Madhubuti's 2005 book, Yellow Black, is an autobiographical novel detailing the first 21 years of his life. He currently resides in Chicago with his wife Safisha (Carol D. Lee), Professor Emerita at Northwestern University.

Awards and honors 
Among the honors and recognition Madhubuti has received are the Distinguished Writers Award, Middle Atlantic Writers Association (1984), American Book Award (1991); African-American Arts Alliance (1993), and fellowships from the National Endowment for the Arts and the National Endowment for the Humanities.

Selected publications
 Dynamite Voices I: Black Poets of the 1960s (essays; Detroit, MI: Broadside Press, 1971)
 (Editor, with P. L. Brown and F. Ward) To Gwen with Love (Chicago, IL: Johnson Publishing, 1971)
 Book of Life (poems; Detroit, MI: Broadside Press, 1973)
 Killing Memory, Seeking Ancestors (poems; Lotus, 1987)
 Black Men: Obsolete, Single, Dangerous?: The African American Family in Transition (1990)
 Claiming Earth: Race, Rage, Rape, Redemption (Chicago, IL: Third World Press, 1994)
 GroundWork: New and Selected Poems 1966–1996 (Chicago, IL: Third World Press, 1996)
 (Editor, with Karenga) Million Man March/Day of Absence: A Commemorative Anthology (foreword by Gwendolyn Brooks and introduction by Bakari Kitwana; Chicago, IL: Third World Press, 1996)
 HeartLove: Wedding and Love Poems (Chicago, IL: Third World Press, 1998)
 Tough Notes: A Healing Call for Creating Exceptional Black Men: Affırmations, Meditations, Readings, and Strategies (Chicago, IL: Third World Press, 2002)
 Yellow Black: The First Twenty-One Years of a Poet's Life (2005)

References

Further reading

External links

Haki Madhubuti Stars in Motherland (film)
Photographs and posters featuring Haki Madhubuti from the EBR African American Cultural Life digital collection, Southern Illinois University Edwardsville
Discogs

 "Haki Madhubuti Pt. 1: Taught By Women"
 "An Interview with Haki R. Madhubuti: Taught by Women & other Writers". Moraine Valley Community College Library

1942 births
20th-century African-American writers
20th-century American male writers
20th-century American poets
21st-century African-American people
21st-century American poets
African-American educators
African-American male writers
African-American poets
African-American publishers (people)
American male poets
Iowa Writers' Workshop alumni
Living people
United States Army soldiers
Writers from Little Rock, Arkansas